The State Normal School at Valley City Historic District, in Valley City, North Dakota, is listed on the National Register of Historic Places.  It is a  historic district that covers the State Normal School at Valley City campus, now known as Valley City State University, and previously also known as the Valley City State Teachers College and as the Valley City State College.

The district includes Modern Movement, Late 19th and 20th Century Revivals, and Late Victorian architecture.  When listed in 1995, it included 11 contributing buildings and two contributing structures.  The Hancock Brothers designed some or all.

See also 
 North Dakota State University District, in Fargo, also NRHP-listed
 University of North Dakota Historic District, in Grand Forks, also NRHP-listed

References

University and college buildings on the National Register of Historic Places in North Dakota
Victorian architecture in North Dakota
Historic districts on the National Register of Historic Places in North Dakota
School buildings completed in 1892
National Register of Historic Places in Barnes County, North Dakota
Valley City State University
Valley City
Modern Movement architecture in the United States